Territorial disputes have occurred throughout history, over lands around the world. Bold indicates one claimant's full control; italics indicates one or more claimants' partial control.

Ongoing disputes between UN member/observer states

Africa

Americas

North America

Territorial disputes between Canada and the United States

South America

Antarctica 

The Antarctic Treaty System, formed on 1 December 1959 and entered into force on 23 June 1961, establishes the legal framework for the management of Antarctica and provides administration for the continent, which is carried out through consultative member meetings. It prevents new territorial claims of all signatories (except the U.S. and Russia) for as long as the treaty is in force. However, it is not a final settlement; parties can choose to withdraw from the System at any time. Furthermore, only a minority of states have signed it, and it is not formally sanctioned by the United Nations. Thus, Antarctica remains the only part of the planet any (non-signatory) state can still lay claim to as terra nullius (on the grounds of it not having been part of any existing state's legal and effective territory).

Asia

Europe

Oceania

Ongoing disputes involving states outside the UN

Ongoing disputes within a state by internal entities

Historical disputes, subsequently settled

Africa

Americas

Antarctica

Asia

Europe

Disputes over territorial waters

Notes

See also 

 Demilitarized zone
 Dependent territory
 Frozen conflict
 List of administrative divisions by country
 List of border conflicts
 List of countries and inhabited areas
 List of countries and territories by land and maritime borders
 List of internal boundary disputes in the Philippines
 List of sovereign states
 Lists of active separatist movements
 Neutral territory
 Territorial claims in the Arctic
 Territorial disputes in the Persian Gulf

References

External links 

 

Territorial disputes
Territorial disputes